In music, Op. 56 stands for Opus number 56. Compositions that are assigned this number include:

 Beethoven – Triple Concerto
 Brahms – Variations on a Theme by Haydn
 Chopin – Mazurkas, Op. 56
 Fauré – Dolly
 Goltzius – Frühlingsfeier
 Mendelssohn – Symphony No. 3
 Prokofiev – Sonata for Two Violins
 Schumann – Studies in the Form of Canons for Organ or Pedal Piano (Etuden in kanonischer Form für Orgel oder Pedalklavier)
 Sibelius – Voces intimae
 Tchaikovsky – Concert Fantasia